The Charities Act is an Act of Parliament passed in New Zealand in 2005. One of the functions of the Act was setting up the Charities Commission.

The Charities Act is administered by the Ministry of Social Development and the Department of Internal Affairs.

See also
Economy of New Zealand

References

External links
Text of the Act

Statutes of New Zealand
2005 in New Zealand law
Charity law
Charities based in New Zealand